In military/security studies and international relations, police action is a military action undertaken without a formal declaration of war. Today the term  counter-insurgency is more used.

Since World War II, formal declarations of war have been rare, especially actions conducted by developed nations in connection with the Cold War. Rather, nations involved in military conflict (especially the major-power nations) sometimes describe the conflict by fighting the war under the auspices of a "police action" to show that it is a limited military operation different from total war.

The earliest appearance of the phrase was in 1883, referring to attempts by Netherlands forces and English forces to liberate the 28-man crew of the SS Nisero, who were held hostage. The Dutch term politionele acties (police actions) was used for this.  The Merriam-Webster's Collegiate Dictionary: Eleventh Edition called it in its 1933 issue; a localized military action undertaken without formal declaration of war by regular armed forces against persons (as guerrillas or aggressors) held to be violators of international peace and order. It was also used to imply a formal claim of sovereignty by colonial powers, such as in the military actions of the Netherlands, United Kingdom, and other allies during the Indonesian National Revolution (1945–1949) and the Malayan Emergency (1948–1960).

Examples of "police actions"
The various Banana Wars, from April 21, 1898 to August 1, 1934, were called police actions by the US government. 

The two major Dutch military offensives, of July 1947 and December 1948, during the Indonesian National Revolution were referred to by the Dutch government as the first and second "police actions".

The 1948 action, by India, against Hyderabad State, code named Operation Polo, was referred to as a police action by the government.

In the early days of the Korean War, President Harry S. Truman referred to the United States response to the North Korean invasion of South Korea as a "police action" under the aegis of the United Nations.

Shortly after the secession of Biafra in 1967, the Nigerian military government launched a "police action" to retake the secessionist territory beginning the Nigerian civil war.

The Vietnam War and the Kargil War were undeclared wars and hence are sometimes described as police actions.

The Soviet–Afghan War was an undeclared war and hence also could be described as a police action, especially since the initial troop deployments into Afghanistan were at the request of the Afghan government.

In other events, the Congress (of the United States) had not made a formal declaration of war, yet the President, as the commander-in-chief, has claimed authority to send in the armed forces when he deemed necessary, with or without the approval of Congress. The legal legitimacy of each of these actions was based upon declarations such as the Gulf of Tonkin Resolution and Iraq Resolution by Congress and various United Nations resolutions. Nonetheless, Congressional approval has been asserted by means of funding appropriations or other authorizations as well as the contested War Powers Resolution.

The United Nations approved police action during the 2011 military intervention in Libya to protect civilians. 
Since the September 11 attacks, states have militarily pursued individuals they deem terrorists within the borders of other states in a form of police action that is not clearly defined in the international law.

So called 'Indonesian security forces' uses police actions against uprisings of Papuans in the most Eastern province. The Indonesian police have been empowered to lead the counterinsurgency operation against the Free Papuan Movement (OPM). Nonetheless, the Indonesian police's deficiencies in battling OPM requires that the police maintain a strong partnership with the Indonesian military.

Under international law

Police actions are authorized specifically by the Security Council under Article 53 (for regional action) or Article 42 (for global action). In both cases, the term used in the Charter text (English) is 'enforcement action'; the term 'police action' is not used.

Appropriate use of the term
Use of the term does not appear to have gained currency outside of the limited arena of justification of military action: for example, the U.S. Navy refers to the Korean conflict as the Korean War, and when they refer to police action, they surround the term in quotation marks.

Similarly, a plaque at the Vietnam Veterans Memorial refers to the Vietnam War as a war, not a police action, even though it was undeclared.

Use of the term "police action" is intended to imply either a claim of formal sovereignty or of authority to intervene militarily at a nation's own discretion, typically unilaterally or with a small group of nations. This is often done through the United Nations or by asserting that the military operation is defensive or humanitarian in nature such as the United Nations Stabilisation Mission in Haiti or the Invasion of Grenada.

See also
 War Powers Resolution
 Declaration of war by the United States
 Gun boat diplomacy
 Humanitarian intervention
 Intervention (international law)
 Interventionism (politics)

References

Military operations by type
Euphemisms
Law of war